Rossend Marsol Clua, known by his nickname Sícoris, (Artesa de Segre, 22 October 1922 - Andorra la Vella, 17 January 2006) was an Andorran journalist and writer.

He studied law in the University of Barcelona and was a correspondent for several publication until he had to leave the country for his anti-Francoist and Catalanist ideals. He was later correspondent for the newspapers La Mañana (1959–1990), La Vanguardia (1965–1978), etc. He worked for Radio Andorra and Ràdio Valira and published several books of poems. He was the conductor of Andorran Literature Night (Nit Literària Andorrana) from its creation in 1978.

Books of poems
 Cel i muntanya, Les Escaldes 1989   	 
 Festa major, Les Escaldes 2001 	 
 La terra dels Valires, Andorra la Vella 2003

References

1922 births
2006 deaths
Andorran writers
Spanish male writers
Spanish expatriates in Andorra
Catalan-language writers
Deaths in Andorra